Julio Gabriel Zúñiga (born 30 January 1995) is an Argentine footballer who plays as a midfielder for Deportivo Madryn.

Career
Zúñiga started his career with River Plate of the Primera División. In September 2016, Zúñiga joined Chacarita Juniors on loan. His debut for the club arrived on 22 October in a 1–0 defeat to All Boys. Eleven further appearances came in 2016–17, a season that ended with promotion to the 2017–18 Primera División. He returned to River Plate prior to the 2017–18 season but was released soon after. Zúñiga joined regional league team Ateneo Mariano Moreno in March 2018. A move to Torneo Federal A's San Lorenzo was completed in September. His first goal came versus Deportivo Maipú on 10 October.

Career statistics
.

References

External links

1995 births
Living people
Place of birth missing (living people)
Argentine footballers
Association football midfielders
Argentine Primera División players
Primera Nacional players
Torneo Federal A players
Club Atlético River Plate footballers
Chacarita Juniors footballers
Deportivo Madryn players